In basketball, Showtime was an era in Los Angeles Lakers history from 1979 to 1991 when the National Basketball Association (NBA) team played an exciting run-and-gun style of basketball. Led by Magic Johnson's passing skills and Kareem Abdul-Jabbar's scoring, the team relied on fast breaks and won five NBA championships. Lakers owner Jerry Buss purchased the team in 1979, and he wanted their games to be entertaining. He insisted that the Lakers play an up-tempo style, and the team hired dancers and a live band for their home games at The Forum. The team established a Hollywood-celebrity following.

Background
  
In 1979, former Lakers owner Jack Kent Cooke was in the process of selling the team to Jerry Buss. Possessing the first overall pick in the upcoming 1979 NBA Draft, the Lakers narrowed their choice to either Magic Johnson or Sidney Moncrief. Los Angeles already had a fine point guard in Norm Nixon, making Moncrief potentially a wonderful complement at off guard. However, Cooke liked Johnson's smile and playing style. In one of Cooke's last acts as Lakers owner, the Lakers drafted the point guard Johnson.

Buss wanted Lakers games to be entertaining. In the 1960s, he was a regular at The Horn, a nightclub in Santa Monica, California, that attracted an upscale clientele. Buss loved the excitement of the club's famous opening act, which included a dimming of the lights followed by a dramatic singing of their signature tune, "It's Showtime". After he purchased the Lakers and The Forum from Cooke, Buss embarked on creating a grand-scale version of The Horn. Like a night club act, he believed a basketball game should be entertaining.

Buss sought to match the excitement of college basketball games between the USC Trojans and the UCLA Bruins during John Wooden's era. The owner insisted the Lakers have a running game. After Jerry West had retired as Lakers head coach, and the team failed to recruit Jerry Tarkanian of the UNLV Runnin' Rebels, Buss hired Jack McKinney to install a running offense.

In Buss' opinion, a theatrical atmosphere paired with the running game would excite the fans and strengthen the Lakers' home-court advantage. He wanted to create a Hollywood atmosphere that would be embraced by the Los Angeles culture even if it was hated by the rest of the country. Buss borrowed the term Showtime from The Horn to describe the Lakers' approach to basketball, and it was embraced by Lakers fans and the Los Angeles media.

Basketball
Buss was not afraid to spend money on players. In 1981, Abdul-Jabbar was the highest-paid player in NBA at $870,000 a season, when Buss signed Johnson to a 25-year, $25 million contract.

Offensive style

The most important component of Showtime was the Lakers' fast break. In a typical sequence, rebounders such as Kareem Abdul-Jabbar, Kurt Rambis, and A.C. Green would quickly release an outlet pass to Johnson, who would race down the court and distribute the ball to players such as Jamaal Wilkes, James Worthy, Byron Scott, and Michael Cooper for a finishing layup or slam dunk. Oftentimes, Johnson would rebound the ball and drive the ball up court himself on a fast break. He would sometimes deliver the ball to teammates with a no-look pass.

If the break was not there, the Lakers would settle into their half-court offense and rely on Abdul-Jabbar—the NBA's all-time leading scorer—and his unique signature skyhook. Backing him up at center were Bob McAdoo, a former NBA Most Valuable Player, and in later years, Mychal Thompson, a former No. 1 overall draft pick; both were ostensibly power forwards who could change the game's pace with their quickness and outside shooting ability. As Abdul-Jabbar neared the age of 40, Riley had Johnson assume scoring responsibilities. Johnson's "junior, junior skyhook" won Game 4 of the 1987 NBA Finals.

Showtime era
McKinney coached the Lakers for only 13 games before he was involved in a serious bike accident during the 1979–80 season. The Lakers replaced him with assistant Paul Westhead, who led the Lakers that season to their first championship in almost a decade. Westhead used McKinney's offense, a creative and spontaneous offense that defined Showtime. However, he started altering the offense the following season. The team started the 1981–82 season at 7–4, but six of those wins were by four points or fewer, and the media criticized Westhead's more-structured offense. Although they had won five in a row, Buss was also disenchanted with the offense and then Johnson, frustrated with Westhead and his system, asked to be traded. Instead, Westhead was fired and replaced by Pat Riley. The Lakers' up-tempo style was restored under Riley, and they won another championship that season.

Riley led the Lakers to four championships. Dressed in sleek Italian suits with his hair slicked back with mousse, he added to the team's Hollywood image. Riley was also innovative on defense; he was one of the first coaches to employ a 1-3-1 half-court trap to pick up the pace of the game. Though the Showtime Lakers were known for their offense, they won championships with their defense. In Cooper, they had one of the top defensive stoppers in the game. The league-wide perception was that the Lakers played with finesse and were not physical enough to win in the playoffs. Riley's mantra was "no rebounds, no rings", reinforcing the need to fight for rebounds in order to win championships.

The Lakers in 1985 won their first championship in nine meetings against the Boston Celtics, and again defeated their rivals for the title in 1987. At the championship celebrations following the 1987 Finals, Riley boldly guaranteed before the cheering crowd that the Lakers would win it all again in 1988. This was a very bold gesture as the league had not had a repeat champion for nearly 20 years.  Nevertheless, this guarantee was fulfilled as the Lakers repeated as champions in 1988, becoming the first NBA team to capture back-to-back championships since the Celtics' repeat title in 1968–69 in legendary center Bill Russell's last season. With the team older, the Lakers were more of a half-court team that season.

Although Abdul-Jabbar retired in 1989, and Riley stepped down the year after, most believe the Showtime era ended in 1991, when the Lakers lost the finals to Michael Jordan and the Chicago Bulls and Johnson retired after finding out he was HIV-positive. By Johnson's last season, he had grown more powerful and stronger than in his earlier years, but the league's third-oldest point guard was also slower and less nimble. Mike Dunleavy was the new head coach, the offense used more half-court sets, and the team had a renewed emphasis on defense. The Prescott Courier called those Lakers "Slow-time".

Season-by-season record

Overall, the Showtime Lakers played 984 regular season games, totaling 712 wins and 272 losses, resulting in a win percentage of 72.4%.

Key players

The following is a list of the key players of the Showtime era (1979–91).

Home crowd

The Lakers played their home games at The Forum, which billed itself as "the modern version of the greater Colosseum of ancient Rome". The Forum was a circle with an oval interior supported by 80 white concrete columns. After he became owner, Buss hired a public address announcer with a livelier voice, Lawrence Tanter. He also transformed the Forum Club, previously a family-friendly restaurant and lounge inside the Forum, into the hottest nightclub in Los Angeles.

Buss lured Hollywood celebrities and the rich and famous to the game to add more excitement in the crowd.  Not only did Buss want stars on his team, he also wanted stars watching them. At the height of Showtime, some celebrities that contacted the team could not even buy tickets. ESPN wrote that The Forum grew to be "as synonymous with movie stars" as the Hollywood Sign. During national telecasts, the network would regularly show the courtside celebrities. Actor Jack Nicholson, considered the Lakers' most well-known celebrity fan, was often seen sitting courtside in his shades. The Washington Post quipped that "The Forum may be the only place where the fans make more money than the players."

A fan of the college game, Buss wanted the Lakers to have live music and cheerleaders. He replaced the arena's organist with a 10-piece band of musicians from the University of Southern California (USC).
Cheerleaders were not common in the NBA at the time, but Buss ordered the formation of the Laker Girls, a talented and sexy team of female dancers. Rex the Peanut Man, a peanut vendor, would dance to entertain the crowd. The Lakers later employed Dancing Barry, a Showtime staple who added to the party atmosphere by dancing in the aisles during timeouts wearing sunglasses and a tuxedo.

The Hartford Courant wrote, "You go to The Fabulous Forum, and you get a basketball game in between lounge acts." The News and Courier added, "Only one thing beats the thrill of victory. Victory with pizzaz." NBA commissioner David Stern said Showtime showed that "an arena can become the focal point for not just basketball, but entertainment."

Aftermath
The Lakers did not win another championship until 2000, which began a streak of three consecutive titles led by stars Shaquille O'Neal and Kobe Bryant. However, the team's style under coach Phil Jackson's triangle offense was not as exciting or graceful, generally grinding down opponents behind O'Neal's strength. Rudy Tomjanovich was hired in 2004 to install an up-tempo offense and revive the high-scoring of the 1980s teams. He was not successful, and the Lakers reverted to the triangle offense as Jackson returned. Under Jackson's guidance, the Lakers were NBA champions again in 2009 and 2010.

The Phoenix Suns with point guard Steve Nash were a running team under Mike D'Antoni, and The New York Times called them "this decade’s incarnation of the Los Angeles Lakers’ Showtime". When D'Antoni joined with the Lakers and Nash in 2012, he declared, "We would love to be able to play 'Showtime' basketball." With slower personnel than he had in Phoenix, D'Antoni eventually abandoned his up-tempo offense. That season, however, Magic Johnson compared the Los Angeles Clippers, the Lakers' crosstown rivals, to Showtime. "I thought I would never, ever see Showtime again. And I was the architect of Showtime. The Clippers? That's Showtime," he said.

See also
Winning Time: The Rise of the Lakers Dynasty, sports drama television series based on Showtime

Notes

References 

1980s in California
Los Angeles Lakers